Al Schoterman (born September 11, 1950) is an American athlete. He competed in the men's hammer throw at the 1972 Summer Olympics.

References

1950 births
Living people
Athletes (track and field) at the 1972 Summer Olympics
American male hammer throwers
Olympic track and field athletes of the United States
Sportspeople from Albany, New York